The LSWR E14 Class was a class of 4-6-0 locomotive designed by Dugald Drummond for the London and South Western Railway.

Background 

The indifferent feedback gained upon the release of Drummond's first 4-6-0 design, the F13 class  meant that he went back to the drawing board to create a new, improved design.  The LSWRs immediate traffic needs were covered to a certain extent by the 4-4-0 designs.  This was because the F13 class 4-6-0 had been withdrawn from the heavy boat train services they were designed to undertake, as they were heavy on coal, water and man-hours in terms of upkeep.  However, the problem of continually accelerating timetables to the South Coast ports remained.

It soon became clear that another 4-6-0 design was needed due to their ability to ply their trade at faster speeds, and their inherent power-to-weight ratio.  This was true with the LSWR's passenger requirements increasing due to lengthened, heavier rolling stock that needed to keep up with faster point-to-point schedules.  He also continued to develop a multiple-cylinder layout.  The resultant design was to become the E14 class.

Construction history 

Drummond had once again settled on the 4-6-0 wheel arrangement in anticipation of further increases in speed and length of trains, a concept that had many advantages. A 175 lbf/in² (1.21 MPa) saturated steam boiler was utilised, therefore generating the steam needed to power a four-cylinder front end, and in this respect, the class differed from his F13 Class.  Drummond's second 4-6-0 locomotive design also incorporated a four-cylinder layout powering 6 ft 0 in (1.829 m) driving wheels.  The new design was equipped with Walschaerts valve gear for both inside and outside the frames, therefore reducing the complexity of the design in respect to spare parts required during overhauls. While Drummond had been given authorisation to build five, only a single E14 class was built.

Rebuilding under Urie

The poor quality of the E14's original design was further highlighted by the fact that it had been earmarked by Drummond only five years after its initial release for major modifications in the light of poor operational performance.  Drummond died before this could be undertaken in 1912, and it fell to his successor, Robert Urie, to undertake the modifications. However, Urie decided to rebuild the locomotive as the eleventh member of his H15 class in 1914.

Livery and numbering 

Under the LSWR, the E14 was outshopped in the LSWR Passenger Sage Green livery with purple-brown edging, creating panels of green.  This was further lined in white and black with 'LSWR' in gilt on the tender tank sides.

Operational details 

The E14 design had originally been intended to operate expresses between Salisbury and Exeter, but were unsuccessful resulting in its operation lasting only a year.  The class saw more success when rostered to operate on the less arduous stretch of track between Salisbury and Southampton, hauling coal trains between these two destinations, a far cry from their intended role.  The locomotive had a high coal consumption and as a result, gained the unenviable nickname of the "Turkey."

References 
Notes

Sources

E14
4-6-0 locomotives
Railway locomotives introduced in 1907
Standard gauge steam locomotives of Great Britain